Popillia acuta is a species of beetle that was described by Edward Newman in 1838. It has been debated whether or not P. acuta is the same species as P. nasuta. It is found in Southwestern India and the East Indies.

Description
Adults have a bright and coppery-gold-green body with castaneous antennae. Its clypeus is acute, prolonged, and turned upwards and its elytra testaceous with a bright and metallic lustre.

References

Rutelinae
Taxa named by Edward Newman